Anja Margetić (born 29 July 1975) is a Bosnian politician and former swimmer who is the current deputy mayor of Sarajevo, serving alongside Haris Bašić. She is a member of Our Party.

As a swimmer, Margetić competed in two events at the 1992 Summer Olympics. She was the first woman to represent Bosnia and Herzegovina at the Olympics.

References

External links

1975 births
Living people
Sportspeople from Sarajevo
Politicians from Sarajevo
Croats of Bosnia and Herzegovina
Bosnia and Herzegovina female swimmers
Olympic swimmers of Bosnia and Herzegovina
Swimmers at the 1992 Summer Olympics